Saint Stephens is an unincorporated community in Seneca County, in the U.S. state of Ohio.

History
The community's namesake St. Stephen Roman Catholic Church was founded in 1842. A post office called Saint Stephen was established in 1876, and remained in operation until 1957.

References

Unincorporated communities in Seneca County, Ohio
Unincorporated communities in Ohio